The Jabirr Jabbirr are an Aboriginal Australian people of the Kimberley region of Western Australia.

Jabirr Jabirr, is also written as Jabirrjabirr and with other spellings such as DjaberrDjaberr, Djaberadjabera, Dyaberdyaber and Jabba Jabba. Their language is the Jabirr Jabirr language.

Country

From the coastal area of Sandy Point at Beagle Bay, their territory went south as far as Cape Bertholet. Their inland extension was about 30 miles.

Running clockwise, their neighbours were, to the north, the Nyulnyul, the Warrwa on their eastern flank, the Nimanburu southeast, and the Ngombal to their south.

History of contact
By 1953 only 5 members of the tribe were still known to survive, and in 1974 Tindale stated that they were virtually extinct.

Alternative spellings
 Djaberadjaber, Djaberdjaber
  Dyaberdyaber
  DjaberrDjaberr
  Jabba Jabba
  Jabirrjabirr
 Tjabartjabara, Tjabirtjabira (Mangarla exonym)
 Tjabiratjabir

Notes

Citations

Sources

Aboriginal peoples of Western Australia